State Road 147 (NM 147) is a  state highway in the US state of New Mexico. NM 147's western terminus is at NM 314 in Isleta Village Proper, and the eastern terminus is at NM 47 in Isleta Pueblo.

Major intersections

See also

References

147
Transportation in Bernalillo County, New Mexico